The Presumpscot River is a  river located in Cumberland County, Maine.  It is the main outlet of Sebago Lake.  The river provided an early transportation corridor with reliable water power for industrial development of the city of Westbrook and the village of South Windham.

Course
The river flows through the communities of Standish, Windham, Gorham, Westbrook, Portland, and Falmouth before emptying into Casco Bay at Falmouth.  The river is bridged by Maine State Route 35 between Standish and Windham, near North Windham, by the North Gorham to Windham Center road between Gorham and Windham, by the Maine Central Railroad Mountain Division between North Windham and South Windham, and by U.S. Route 202 in South Windham.  The river is bridged again by the Maine Central Mountain Division in Westbrook and by U.S. Route 302 at Riverton between Westbrook and Portland.  In Falmouth the river is bridged by the former Interstate 495, (now route 295); concurrent Maine State Routes 26 and 100, Interstate 95, Maine State Route 9, the Maine Central Railroad, Interstate 295, the Grand Trunk Railway, and U.S. Route 1.

Sources
The Sebago Lake drainage basin includes the Crooked River draining Songo Pond south of Bethel, and the Bear River from Waterford through Long Lake. The basin is between the Saco River drainage basin to the west and the Androscoggin River drainage basin to the north and east. In addition to Sebago Lake's being its primary source, four significant tributaries of the river are the Pleasant River from Gray through Windham, the Little River from Buxton through Gorham, Mill Brook in Westbrook (which is an outlet of Highland Lake in Windham), and the Piscataqua River in Falmouth (which is an outlet of Forest Lake in Cumberland).  An East Branch Piscataqua River flows separately into the Presumpscot main stem. The Presumpscot River drainage basin south of Sebago Lake is between the Royal River drainage basin to the east, and the Saco River and Stroudwater River drainage basins to the west and south, respectively.

Little Sebago Lake originally drained westerly into Sebago Lake through Boody Meadow and Outlet Brook.  An artificial outlet was constructed through a moraine at the south end of Little Sebago Lake as an early 19th-century water power diversion to the Pleasant River via Ditch Brook.  On 4 June 1814, the diversion became enlarged by erosion as the lake level dropped  within a few hours, draining great quantities of water into the Pleasant River.  The resulting flood swept away two mills and six bridges along the Pleasant and Presumpscot rivers as far downstream as South Windham.  The erosion scar is bridged today by Maine State Route 115 east of North Windham.  The level of Little Sebago Lake was partially restored by construction of a dam which failed with similar downstream damage on 7 May 1861, and has been subsequently rebuilt.

Early industrial development
Sawmills were built on the river during the 1660s. The first Maine paper mill was built on the river at Falmouth in 1731 by General Samuel Waldo.

Canal
The river was an early transportation corridor between Casco Bay and Sebago Lake.  A series of dams and locks were completed in 1830 to form the Cumberland and Oxford Canal.  The canal operated until replaced by the Portland and Ogdensburg Railway in 1870.  The canal lock system provided elevation control of the  surface area of Sebago Lake as a reservoir for water-powered mills along the river.  The S. D. Warren Paper Mill in Westbrook vied with the Oriental Powder Company in Gorham and Windham to control water flow after the canal ceased operation of the locks.  The paper mill exercised control for more than half a century after the gunpowder factory closed in 1905.

Dams
There are seven dams impeding the flow of the river as it makes its way to the ocean, some of which produce hydroelectric power.  These dams are the Eel Weir Dam, North Gorham Dam, Dundee Dam, Gambo Dam, Little Falls Dam, Mallison Dam, and Cumberland Mills Dam. The Saccarappa Dam removal commenced in 2019. Since the removal of the Smelt Hill Dam in Falmouth in 2002, the last  of the river after the Cumberland Mills Dam now flow unimpeded to the ocean.

Conservation
The Presumpscot River Preserve, a 48-acre nature preserve, is located in North Deering alongside the Presumpscot River. It was purchased and preserved in 2001 by the Land for Maine's Future program as well as the City Land Bank Commission and Portland Trails.

In August 2014, Portland Trails preserved 20 acres of land in the Presumpscot River estuary in Falmouth around Mile Pond.

Notes

Bibliography

External links 

 The promise of the Presumpscot River KeepMEcurrent.com, March 28, 2013

Rivers of Cumberland County, Maine
Geography of Portland, Maine
Falmouth, Maine
Gorham, Maine
Standish, Maine
Westbrook, Maine
Windham, Maine
Rivers of Maine